Mount Rio Branco is a mountain, 975 m, standing 2.5 nautical miles (4.6 km) east of Cape Perez on the west coast of Graham Land. Discovered by the French Antarctic Expedition, 1908–10, and named by Charcot for Baron Rio Branco, at that time Minister of Foreign Affairs of Brazil.
 

Mountains of Graham Land
Graham Coast